Cervantes is a town in Western Australia located off of Indian Ocean Drive about  north-north-west of the state capital, Perth in the Shire of Dandaragan local government area.  At the 2016 census, Cervantes had a population of 527.  The town was named after a ship that was wrecked nearby.  The ship, in turn, was named after Miguel de Cervantes, author of Don Quixote.

The principal industry in the town is fishing.  The Pinnacles are nearby in Nambung National Park which makes for a small industry from tourism. The saline Lake Thetis, which contains stromatolites, is nearby.

An arts festival is held every year in the town, usually on the last weekend of October. Cervantes lies on the shore of the Jurien Bay Marine Park.

Most of the streets are named after cities, regions and rivers in Spain.

References

External links

Coastal towns in Western Australia
Shire of Dandaragan